Turritella radula is a species of sea snail, a marine gastropod mollusk in the family Turritellidae. The Mollusk is found in the south-eastern Bioregion, it is found mainly in Santa Cruz.
Mexico, Acapulco, Ecuador and the Galapagos islands.

Description

Distribution
Bioregions: South-eastern.
Galapagos island groups: Santa Cruz.
Mexico, Acapulco, Ecuador including Galapagos islands.

References

Turritellidae
Gastropods described in 1843